The Bighorn Ditch Headgate, also known as the Bighorn Canal Headgate, was built starting in 1892 to provide irrigation to the Crow Indian Reservation in south central Montana. The headgate structure diverted water from the Bighorn River to their lands. It was designed by William F. Graves, and construction was carried out by Crow workers. The project was completed in 1904. Today the site is included in Bighorn Canyon National Recreation Area.

The structure includes a diversion dam extending at an angle into the river to divert water through the headgate into a canal flowing parallel to the river. Five iron gates controlled the flow. The headgate structure is intermittently inundated by water held in the Yellowtail Dam Afterbay reservoir.

The Bighorn Ditch was instrumental to the Crow changing from their nomadic lifestyle to a settled, agrarian society. Their initial attempts at farming in the arid climate, beginning in 1885, resulted in failure. The government at last recognized that irrigation of the lands would be required for the people to gain consistent yields from their crops. The 1891 Reno Ditch provided water to 4500 (later 12,500) Crow acres. As a result, the Crow no longer needed Federal food subsidies.

The Bighorn Ditch headgate was placed on the National Register of Historic Places on December 12, 1976.

References

External links
 Bighorn Ditch Headgate, at Bighorn Canyon National Recreation Area

Industrial buildings and structures on the National Register of Historic Places in Montana
Irrigation in the United States
National Register of Historic Places in Bighorn Canyon National Recreation Area
Crow tribe
Water supply infrastructure on the National Register of Historic Places
National Register of Historic Places in Big Horn County, Montana
Water in Montana